Philip Coombs may refer to:

 Philip H. Coombs (1915–2006), American educator
 Philip D. Coombs (1946–2001), Washington State archivist